D26 is a state road in central Croatia connecting the D5 in Daruvar and the D10 expressway near Vrbovec (Dubrava interchange), comprising a connection to the planned but cancelled A12 motorway route.

The road, as well as all other state roads in Croatia, is managed and maintained by Hrvatske ceste, a state owned company.

Traffic volume 

Traffic is regularly counted and reported by Hrvatske ceste, operator of the road.

Road junctions and populated areas

Maps

Sources

D026
D026
D026